Elizabeth Ward Gracen (born Elizabeth Grace Ward, April 3, 1961) is an American actress and beauty pageant contestant who won the title of Miss America in 1982.

Early life and education 
Elizabeth Grace Ward was born on April 3, 1961, in Ozark, Arkansas, the daughter of Patricia Hampe, a nurse, and Jimmy Young Ward, a poultry worker. She was raised in Booneville, Arkansas. The family later moved to Russellville, Arkansas, where Ward dated University of Arkansas trainer Mike Walker and graduated from Russellville High School in 1979. She was a junior accounting major at Arkansas Tech University at the time she entered the Miss America contest.  Instead of returning to Arkansas Tech, she used her Miss America scholarship money to study acting at HB Studios in New York City.

Career

Pageants and modeling
Gracen won the titles of Miss Arkansas in 1981 and Miss America in 1982. After her yearlong work as Miss America, she enrolled in acting classes then relocated to California to pursue a film and television career.

Gracen posed nude for Playboy magazine's May 1992 issue.

Acting
Gracen made her professional feature film debut in Three For The Road with Charlie Sheen. Her film credits also include a featured role in Marked for Death, opposite Steven Seagal, Pass The Ammo with Tim Curry, and the CBS feature 83 Hours Till Dawn with Peter Strauss and Robert Urich. Gracen starred in Lower Level and Discretion Assured with Michael York.

On television, Gracen has appeared in Shelley Duvall's Strange Case of Dr. Jekyll and Mr. Hyde, Sidney Sheldon's The Sands of Time, and The Death of the Incredible Hulk. She also appeared with a starring role in the series Extreme for NBC and the syndicated series Renegade and Queen of Swords.

Gracen's best-known acting role has been as the recurring character Amanda, a 1,200-year-old immortal, in the series Highlander: The Series and its spin-off series Highlander: The Raven.

In December 1999, Gracen filed for bankruptcy protection. After few television guest roles, and a supporting role in the made-for-television movie Interceptor Force 2, she took a long leave of absence from acting, beginning in 2002. Gracen began doing voiceover work for Blue Hours Productions, which has revived the classic radio anthology Suspense, which airs on Sirius XM.  In 2012, Gracen did a character voice-over in the Malaysian animated science fiction film War of the Worlds: Goliath.

Directing, producing, and writing
In 2012, Gracen formed Flapper Films. In 2014, she starred in Coherence, a sci-fi indie thriller. In January 2016, Gracen established Flapper Press and self-published Shalilly, a young adult fantasy novel.

Gracen made her directorial debut with a documentary short, "The Damn Deal," about three young drag queens from Arkansas who compete in female impersonator beauty pageants.

Personal life

Marriages and family
Gracen married Jon Birmingham in 1982, and they divorced in 1984.

In 1989, while filming Sundown: The Vampire in Retreat, she met actor Brendan Hughes, and they married soon after. They divorced in 1994.

Gracen married Adam Murphy, and they have a daughter.

Affair with Bill Clinton
According to Gracen, some time in 1983, she had a one-night stand with future President Bill Clinton when he was Governor of Arkansas. She was married at the time, as was he.

In 1992, rumors swirled that Gracen had had an affair with Clinton. At first, Gracen dismissed this claim (as requested by Clinton's campaign manager Mickey Kantor); however, in spring 1998 Gracen recanted her six-year-old denial and stated she had a one-night stand with Clinton in 1983. After her claim, Independent Counsel Kenneth Starr, who was investigating Clinton in the Paula Jones lawsuit, issued a subpoena to have her testify to her claim in court. However, Gracen eluded the subpoena  and was at one point able to avoid it because Highlander: The Raven was being filmed outside of the US. Paula Jones's legal team was also unable to track down Gracen because she had made unscheduled trips to Las Vegas and the Caribbean.

Filmography 
 Three for the Road (1987) Nadine
 Pass the Ammo (1988) Christie Lynn
 The Strange Case of Dr. Jekyll and Mr. Hyde (1989)
 Lisa (1989) Mary
 The Death of the Incredible Hulk (1990) Jasmin
 Marked for Death (1990) Melissa
 The Flash (1990 TV Series) 1 episode - Celia Wayne 
 83 Hours 'Til Dawn (1990) Maria Ranfield
 Sundown: The Vampire in Retreat (1991) Alice
 Lower Level (1992) Hillary
 The Sands of Time (1992)
 Final Mission (1993) Caitlin Cole
 Time Trax episode 7 (1993) Sydney
 Discretion Assured (1993) Miranda
 Highlander: The Series (1992–1998) Amanda
 Murder, She Wrote (1994) Michelle Scarlotti
 The Expert (1995) Liz Pierce
 Extreme (1995) Callie Manners
 Kounterfeit (1996) Bridgette
 Highlander: The Raven (1998–1999) Amanda
 Queen of Swords "Counterfeit Queen" (2000) Carlotta
 Charmed "Bite Me" (2002) Vampire Queen
 Interceptor Force 2 (2002) Adriana Sikes
 War of the Worlds: Goliath (2012) Lt. Jennifer Carter (voice) 
 Coherence (2013) Beth

References

External links

 
 

 
 

 
 

1961 births
Living people
Actresses from Arkansas
American television actresses
Miss America 1980s delegates
Miss America Preliminary Swimsuit winners
Miss America winners
People from Booneville, Arkansas
People from Ozark, Arkansas
People from Pope County, Arkansas
20th-century American actresses
21st-century American actresses
Bill Clinton